The Captain class was a designation given to 78 frigates of the Royal Navy, constructed in the United States, launched in 1942–1943 and delivered to the United Kingdom under the provisions of the Lend-Lease agreement (the program under which the United States supplied the United Kingdom and other Allied nations with materiel between 1941 and 1945), they were drawn from two subclasses of the American destroyer escort (originally British destroyer escort) classification; 32 from the GMT type Evarts subclass and 46 from the TE type Buckley subclass.

Naming
It was the intention of the Admiralty that these ships were to be named after captains that served with Vice-Admiral Horatio Nelson at the Battle of Trafalgar but as building continued, it became necessary to delve back further into history for names of admirals and captains of reputation.

Sixty-six of the 78 frigates bear names that had not previously been allocated earlier Royal Navy ships. Lawford, Louis, Manners, Moorsom, Mounsey, Narborough, Pasley and Seymour had been previously used for destroyers during World War I.  was the fifth of that name since 1666. Torrington was the fourth of that name since 1654. Holmes had been used once before in 1671 and Fitzroy, after Robert FitzRoy, the pioneering meteorologist, had previously been used for a survey vessel in 1919.

Ships

Evarts group (diesel-electric machinery)
The Evarts subclass had diesel-electric machinery, based on an arrangement used for submarines. There were two shafts. For this reason they were referred to as the GMT (General Motors Tandem) type. All the DE Captains were built by Boston Navy Yard. Except  who appears to be the odd one out.

Buckley group (turbo-electric machinery)
The Buckley subclass had turbo-electric machinery. Because of this they were referred to as the TE type. Two Foster Wheeler Express "D"-type water-tube boilers supplied steam to GE  steam turbines and generators (9,200 kW). This all electric drive-train was considered particularly innovative at the time (although the Catherine-class minesweepers had a similar arrangement).

All the electric drive Captains were built by Bethlehem Shipbuilding Corporation.

See also
 List of frigates
 List of frigate classes of the Royal Navy

Notes

References

Citations

Sources
.
.
Elliott, Peter "The Lend-Lease Captains". Warship International No.3 1972: N3/72:255. §N1/73:5.
.
.